Quantity take-offs (QTO) are a detailed measurement of materials and labor needed to complete a construction project. They are developed by an estimator during the pre-construction phase. This process includes breaking the project down into smaller and more manageable units that are easier to measure or estimate. The level of detail required for measurement may vary. These measurements are used to format a bid on the scope of construction.  Estimators review drawings, specifications and models to find these quantities.  Experienced estimators have developed procedures to help them quantify their work.  Many programs have been developed to aid in the efficiency of these processes. With BIM quantity take-off can be conducted almost automatically given that the type of materials, their quantity and price is included in the model. It is known that construction projects often run overtime and over budget and one of the reasons is lack of accuracy in quantity takeoff and estimates.

References 

Building engineering
Construction management